The Wolf Prize in Physics is awarded once a year by the Wolf Foundation in Israel. It is one of the six Wolf Prizes established by the Foundation and awarded since 1978; the others are in Agriculture, Chemistry, Mathematics, Medicine and Arts.

The Wolf Prizes in physics and chemistry are often considered the second most prestigious awards in those fields, after the Nobel Prize. The prize in physics has gained a reputation for identifying future winners of the Nobel Prize – from the 26 prizes awarded between 1978 and 2010, fourteen winners have gone on to win the Nobel Prize, five of those in the following year.

Laureates

Laureates per country 
Below is a chart of all laureates per country (updated to 2023 laureates). Some laureates are counted more than once if have multiple citizenship.

See also

 List of physics awards

References

External links 
 List of Wolf Prize laureates, Wolf Foundation
 
 
 Wolf Prizes 2015 
 Jerusalempost - Wolf Prizes 2016
 Jerusalempost - Wolf Prizes 2017
 Jerusalempost - Wolf Prizes 2018

Physics
Physics awards
Lists of Israeli award winners
Awards established in 1978
Israeli science and technology awards
1978 establishments in Israel